Frankville is an unincorporated community in Washington County, Alabama, United States, located on County Route 31,  east of Millry. Frankville has a post office with ZIP code 36538.

Since 1926 it is the home to the annual Frankville Old Time Fiddlers Convention, held in the former local school building.

References

Unincorporated communities in Washington County, Alabama
Unincorporated communities in Alabama